Ionocaloric refrigeration is used to cool matter so that it gets cold, it is an alternative to vapor-compression refrigeration.

Applications are refrigeration which means it can be used for example in a fridge to keep ice cream cold for storage. An advantage is that it is environmentally friendly. Disadvantages include that it is new technology that is not mature.

It was developed by Drew Lilley and Ravi Prasher at Department of Energy's Lawrence Berkeley National Laboratory.

Description of the ionocaloric refrigeration system 
Ionocaloric cooling uses ions to drive solid-to-liquid phase transitions.

See also 
 Refrigerant
 Refrigeration
 Refrigeration cycle
 Vapor-compression refrigeration

References

External links 
 Berkeley Lab Scientists Develop a Cool New Method of Refrigeration
 

2022 introductions
American inventions
Cooling technology
Thermodynamic cycles